The third season of the American television drama series The Americans, consisting of 13 episodes, premiered on FX on January 28, 2015, and concluded on April 22, 2015. The series was renewed for the third season on April 16, 2014.

The events of the third season begin in late 1982 and end on March 8, 1983, the night of Ronald Reagan's Evil Empire speech.

Cast

Main
 Keri Russell as Elizabeth Jennings (Nadezhda), a KGB officer
 Matthew Rhys as Philip Jennings (Mischa), a KGB officer
 Lev Gorn as Arkady Ivanovich Zotov, the KGB's Resident
 Annet Mahendru as Nina Sergeevna Krilova, Beeman's Soviet mole
 Susan Misner as Sandra Beeman, Stan's wife
 Costa Ronin as Oleg Igorevich Burov, a KGB officer
 Keidrich Sellati as Henry Jennings, Elizabeth and Philip's son
 Holly Taylor as Paige Jennings, Elizabeth and Philip's daughter
 Richard Thomas as Frank Gaad, special agent in charge of the FBI Counterintelligence Division
 Alison Wright as Martha Hanson, Gaad's secretary and Philip's informant
 Noah Emmerich as Stan Beeman, an FBI agent

Recurring
 Frank Langella as Gabriel, one of Philip and Elizabeth's KGB handlers
 Brandon J. Dirden as Dennis Aderholt, an FBI agent
 Vera Cherny as Tatiana Evgenyevna Vyazemtseva, a KGB officer working at the Rezidentura
 Peter Mark Kendall as Hans, a South African graduate student and KGB informant being trained by Elizabeth
 Svetlana Efremova as Zinaida Preobrazhenskaya, a defector from the Institute for US and Canadian Studies
 Karen Pittman as Lisa, a Northrop employee from whom Elizabeth is gleaning information
 Kelly AuCoin as Pastor Tim, the head of a church Paige Jennings attends
 Julia Garner as Kimberly Breland, the daughter of the head of the CIA's Afghan group
 Rahul Khanna as Yousaf Rana, an officer in the Pakistani ISI Covert Action Division
 Michael Aronov as Anton Baklanov, a scientist involved in stealth technology
 Jefferson Mays as Walter Taffet, an officer for the Office of Professional Responsibility
 Gillian Alexy as Annelise, an informant of Philip's
 Daniel Flaherty as Matthew Beeman, Stan's son
 Callie Thorne as Tori, a woman Stan meets at EST
 Margo Martindale as Claudia, one of Philip and Elizabeth's KGB handlers
 Reg Rogers as Charles Duluth, a journalist and KGB source
 Peter Von Berg as Vasili Nikolaevich, a former KGB Resident
 Katja Herbers as Evi Sneijder, Nina's cellmate

Production
Lev Gorn, who portrays Arkady Ivanovich, was promoted to series regular for the third season, after having a recurring role throughout the first two seasons. Additionally, Costa Ronin and Richard Thomas were promoted from recurring status to series regulars. In October 2014, Frank Langella was cast in a recurring role. Filming for the season began in October 2014. Co-star Noah Emmerich directed the seventh episode of the season, marking his directorial debut.

Episodes

Reception

Critical response
The third season received widespread critical acclaim. On Rotten Tomatoes, it received a 100% approval rating, with an average score of 9/10 based on 53 reviews. The critical consensus reads: "Family-driven drama and psychological themes propel The Americans' tautly drawn tension, dispensing thrills of a different ilk this season." On Metacritic, it scored 92 out of 100 based on 23 reviews.

Accolades
The series was given a 2014 Peabody Award, with the organization stating, "In this ingenious, addictive cliffhanger, Reagan-era Soviet spies—married with children and a seemingly endless supply of wigs—operate out of a lovely 3BR home in a suburb of Washington, D.C. Between their nail-biter missions (and sometimes in the midst of them), the series contemplates duty, honor, parental responsibility, fidelity, both nationalistic and marital, and what it means to be an American."

For the 5th Critics' Choice Television Awards, it won for Best Drama Series and received three acting nominations—Keri Russell for Best Actress in a Drama Series, Matthew Rhys for Best Actor in a Drama Series, and Lois Smith for Best Guest Performer in a Drama Series. For the 31st TCA Awards, the series was nominated for Program of the Year, Rhys was nominated for Individual Achievement in Drama, and it won for Outstanding Achievement in Drama.

For the 67th Primetime Emmy Awards, Margo Martindale won for Outstanding Guest Actress in a Drama series after her third consecutive nomination, and Joshua Brand was nominated for Outstanding Writing for a Drama Series for "Do Mail Robots Dream of Electric Sheep?".

For the 68th Writers Guild of America Awards, the series was nominated for Best Drama Series.

Home media releases
The third season was released on DVD in region 1 on March 1, 2016. Special features include deleted scenes and a featurette titled "The Cold War for Paige".

References

External links
 
 

2015 American television seasons
Season 3
Television series set in 1983